The second Rabuka government is the incumbent government of Fiji since 2022, following the 2022 Fijian general election. It is a coalition of four parties: the People's Alliance, the National Federation Party (NFP) and the Social Democratic Liberal Party (SODELPA).

History
After the formation of the coalition government following the 2022 general election, which resulted in a hung parliament, Rabuka and his cabinet were sworn in on 23 December, 2022, ten days after the election. The coalition parties won a total of 29 seats, three more than FijiFirst.

List of executive members

See also
 First Rabuka government, the government of Fiji from 1992 until 1999 (also lead by Rabuka)

References

Notes

Cabinets established in 2022
Coalition governments
Rabuka government of Fiji
Rabuka 2